|}

This is a list of electoral region results for the Western Australian Legislative Council in the 1986 Western Australian state election.

Results by Electoral province

Central

Lower Central

Lower North 

 Preferences were not distributed.

Lower West

Metropolitan 

 Preferences were not distributed.

North 

 Preferences were not distributed.

North Central Metropolitan 

 Preferences were not distributed.

North Metropolitan

North-East Metropolitan 

 Preferences were not distributed.

South

South Central Metropolitan 

 Preferences were not distributed.

South East

South Metropolitan

South-East Metropolitan 

 Preferences were not distributed.

South West

Upper West

West 

 Preferences were not distributed.

See also 

 Results of the Western Australian state election, 1986 (Legislative Assembly A-L)
 Results of the Western Australian state election, 1986 (Legislative Assembly M-Z)
 1986 Western Australian state election
 Candidates of the Western Australian state election, 1986
 Members of the Western Australian Legislative Council, 1986–1989

References 

Results of Western Australian elections
1986 elections in Australia